Kozinka is a rural locality (a selo) and the administrative center of Kozinskoye Rural Settlement, Grayvoronsky District, Belgorod Oblast, Russia. The population was 1,097 as of 2010. There are 26 streets.

Geography 
Kozinka is located 12 km southwest of Grayvoron (the district's administrative centre) by road. Glotovo is the nearest rural locality.

References 

Rural localities in Grayvoronsky District
Volchansky Uyezd